Pablo Valcarce Vidal (born 3 February 1993) is a Spanish professional footballer who plays for Burgos CF. Mainly a right winger, he can also play as a forward.

Club career

Numancia
Born in Ponferrada, Castile and León, Valcarce began his career with hometown club SD Ponferradina, making his senior debut with the reserves. In 2011 he moved to CD Numancia, being initially assigned to the youth setup and being promoted to the B team after one year.

On 30 January 2015, both Valcarce and his twin brother Luis renewed their contract with the Rojillos, until 2017. He played his first match as a professional on 15 March, coming on as a late substitute for Javier del Pino in a 4–0 away loss against Real Valladolid in the Segunda División.

Valcarce scored his first league goal on 23 August, his team's fifth in a 6–3 home victory over CD Tenerife. Six days later, he netted twice in a 3–2 win at Girona FC, the second being a last-minute effort.

On 29 January 2016, Valcarce signed his first professional contract, being definitely promoted to the main squad and assigned the number 20 jersey. He scored two braces during the 2016–17 campaign, against Elche CF (2–2, at home) and UCAM Murcia CF (3–2 away loss), both in November.

Mallorca
On 2 July 2018, free agent Valcarce signed a four-year contract with fellow second division side RCD Mallorca. He made his official debut on 19 August, playing 20 minutes in place of Aridai Cabrera in a 1–0 home defeat of CA Osasuna.

Valcarce scored his first goal on 1 December 2018, in 2–0 away win against CF Reus Deportiu. He made only ten appearances during the season (12 across all competitions), as the club achieved a second consecutive promotion to reach La Liga.

On 19 July 2019, Valcarce returned to Ponferradina after agreeing to a one-year loan deal. On 14 September of the following year, the move was extended for a further season.

Burgos
On 1 August 2021, Valcarce joined Burgos CF, newly promoted to the second division, after terminating his contract with Mallorca.

Career statistics

References

External links

1993 births
Living people
People from Ponferrada
Spanish twins
Twin sportspeople
Sportspeople from the Province of León
Spanish footballers
Footballers from Castile and León
Association football wingers
Association football forwards
Segunda División players
Tercera División players
SD Ponferradina B players
CD Numancia B players
CD Numancia players
RCD Mallorca players
SD Ponferradina players
Burgos CF footballers